Good Time Max is a 2007 drama film directed by James Franco, who also co-wrote and co-stars in the film. It premiered at the 6th Annual Tribeca Film Festival.

Plot
Two genius brothers grow up and grow apart as one becomes a successful surgeon and the other pursues a drug-fueled high life.

Cast
 James Franco as Max
 Vince Jolivette as Bruce
 Wilmer Calderon as T-Ray
 Trip Hope as Skeet
 Richard Portnow as Head Administrator
 Jarrod Bunch as Doug
 Robyn Cohen as Jo
 Peter Mackenzie as Anesthesiologist
 Brian Lally as Lt. Lally / Philosophical Biker
 Charity Shea as Big Guy's Girl
 Molly Cheek as Carol
 Mary Payne as Teacher
 Mark Hapka as Mark
 Bailey Hughes as Young Max
 Tylor Chase as Young Adam
 Matt Bell as Adam
 David Garrett as Intern Cohen
 Jack Samet as Rabbi

Production
Filming took place in Agua Dulce, Los Angeles, and South Pasadena, California, as well as New York City.

References

External links 
 

2007 films
2007 drama films
Films directed by James Franco
American drama films
2000s English-language films
2000s American films